Chekan-Tamak (Säkäntamaq) is a rural locality (a selo) in Nizhnezaitovsky Selsoviet, Sharansky District, Bashkortostan, Russia. The population was 78 as of 2010. There are 3 street.

Geography 
Chekan-Tamak is located 33 km west of Sharan (the district's administrative centre) by road. Nizhnezaitovo is the nearest rural locality.

References 

Rural localities in Sharansky District